Paziella atlantis is a species of sea snail, a marine gastropod mollusk in the family Muricidae, the murex snails or rock snails.

Description
The size of the shell reaches 24 mm.

Distribution
This species is distributed in the Caribbean Sea along Cuba.

References

 Merle D., Garrigues B. & Pointier J.-P. (2011) Fossil and Recent Muricidae of the world. Part Muricinae. Hackenheim: Conchbooks. 648 pp. page(s): 164

Muricidae
Gastropods described in 1945